Series 9 of La France a un incroyable talent (a French TV show) aired from 9 December 2014 to 27 January 2015 on the M6 channel.

Semi Final 1

Semi Final 2

Finale

France
2014 French television seasons